John Exton (died 1430) was a Canon of Windsor from 1405 to 1430

Career

He was appointed:
Prebendary of the Church of St Mary de Castro, Leicester 1404 - 1405
Auditor of St George's Chapel, Windsor Castle 1410 - 1411

He was appointed to the sixth stall in St George's Chapel, Windsor Castle in 1404 and held the canonry until 1430.

Notes 

1430 deaths
Canons of Windsor
Year of birth unknown